Lucidota punctata is a species of firefly in the beetle family Lampyridae. It is found in North America.

References

Further reading

External links

 

Lampyridae
Bioluminescent insects
Articles created by Qbugbot
Beetles described in 1852
Beetles of North America